Sardis Baptist Church may refer to:

 Sardis Baptist Church (Birmingham, Alabama), listed on the NRHP in Alabama
 Sardis Baptist Church (Union Springs, Alabama), listed on the NRHP in Alabama
 Sardis Baptist Church (Chattoogaville, Georgia), listed on the NRHP in Georgia
 Sardis Primitive Baptist Church in Madison, North Carolina